Tirumanancheri Udhvaganathar Temple (திருமணஞ்சேரி உத்வாகநாதர் கோயில்) is a Hindu temple at Thirumanancheri in Mayiladuthurai district of Tamil Nadu, India. The presiding deity is Shiva. He is called Udhvaganathar. His consort is known as Kokhila. Sri Kalyanasundareswarar Swamy Temple is another name for this temple.

Significance 
It is a  shrine of the 275 Paadal Petra Sthalams, Shiva Sthalams glorified in the early medieval Tevaram poems by Tamil Saivite Nayanars Tirugnanasambandar and Tirunavukkarasar. The temple is counted as one of the temples built on the banks of River Kaveri.

Literary mention 
Tirugnanasambandar describes the feature of the deity as in Gnanasambandar Tevaram, II: 16: 4. Tirunavukkarasar describes the feature of the deity in Tirunavukkarasar Tevaram, V: 87: 6.

Edirkolpadi Temple, Thirumanancheri
Edirkolpadi Temple is nearby in the same town. This is one of the Thevaram Paadal Petra Shiva Sthalam of Kaveri Vadakarai in Chozha Nadu. It is also called Melai Thirumanajeri.

References

External links 
 
 

Shiva temples in Mayiladuthurai district
Padal Petra Stalam